Wildenbörten is a village and a former municipality in the district Altenburger Land, in Thuringia, Germany. Since 1 January 2019, it is part of the town Schmölln.

Geography

Neighboring municipalities
Municipalities near Wildenbörten are Drogen, Löbichau, Lumpzig, Mehna, and Nöbdenitz in the district of Altenburger Land; as well as Großenstein and Reichstädt in the district of Greiz.

Municipal organization
The municipality of Wildenbörten consisted of five subdivisions:  Wildenbörten, Dobra, Graicha, Hartroda, and Kakau.

History
Within the German Empire (1871–1918), Wildenbörten was part of the Duchy of Saxe-Altenburg.

References 

Altenburger Land
Duchy of Saxe-Altenburg
Former municipalities in Thuringia